Margarites vahlii, common name the Vahl margarite, is a species of sea snail, a marine gastropod mollusk in the family Margaritidae.

Description
The height of the shell attains 1.2 mm, its diameter 1.8 mm. The small, solid shell has a turbinate shape. It is pale flesh color, polished, smooth. It has five well rounded whorls, including a minute subglobular nucleus. The suture is very distinct, not appressed. The base of the shell is rounded with a narrow deep perforate umbilicus. The simple aperture is subcircular. The inner lip is hardly thickened. The body is covered with a thin coat of enamel.

Distribution
This marine species occurs off Greenland, Canada, in the Arctic Ocean north of Bering Strait, at depths between 4 m and 931 m.

References

 Möller, H. P. C. 1842. Index molluscorum Groenlandiae. Naturhistorisk Tidsskrift 4: 76–97.
 Dall, W. H. 1921. Nomenclatorial notes. Nautilus 35: 49–50.

External links
 

vahlii
Gastropods described in 1842